Jonathan M. Marks (born 1955) is a professor of biological anthropology at the University of North Carolina at Charlotte. He is a significant figure in anthropology, especially on the topic of race. Marks is skeptical of genetic explanations of human behavior, of "race" as a biological category, and of science as a rationalistic endeavor. He is a fellow of the American Association for the Advancement of Science.

Early life and education
Born in 1955, Marks studied at the Johns Hopkins University in Baltimore and took graduate degrees in genetics and anthropology from the University of Arizona, completing his doctorate in 1984.

When Marks was beginning his career, few anthropologists held degrees in genetics. The Charlotte Observer quotes him as saying, “Twenty-five years ago I was sort of avant garde. Now it’s much more common.”

Career
Marks is a leading figure in anthropology, especially when it comes to public discussions of race. His work has been praised by scholars such as Alondra Nelson, Agustín Fuentes, and Barbara J. King.

Marks did post-doctoral research in the genetics department at UC-Davis from 1984-1987, then taught at Yale for ten years and Berkeley for three, before settling in Charlotte where he is now a professor at the University of North Carolina-Charlotte.

Marks has also served on the board of directors of the Indigenous Peoples Council on Biocolonialism, Nixon, Nevada.

He was elected to a fellow of the American Association for the Advancement of Science in 2006.

In 2009, Santa Fe's School for Advanced Research awarded him its J. I. Staley Prize for his book What It Means to be 98% Chimpanzee: Apes, People and their Genes. In their award citation, the review panel noted that the book "is being read across anthropological disciplines" and "engages with issues directly relevant to the future of humanity."

He received the First Citizens Bank Scholars Medal in 2012, honoring his career of intellectual inquiry.

Since then he has been a Templeton Fellow (2013-2014) and a Director's Fellow (2019-2020) at the University of Notre Dame's Institute for Advanced Study, and a Visiting Research Fellow at the Max Planck Institute for the History of Science in Berlin and at the ESRC Genomics Forum at the University of Edinburgh.

Views
Marks' 2002 book What it Means to be 98% Chimpanzee argued that there is a significant gap between scientists' knowledge of genetics and their understanding of its functional significance. In opposition to biological determinism, Marks explores evidence for synergy between genetic and cultural factors in shaping human traits such as body shape, school performance, athleticism, and even menstrual cycles.

Marks' published works include many scholarly articles and essays. He is an outspoken critic of scientific racism, and has prominently argued against the idea that "race" is a natural category. In Marks's view, "race" is a negotiation between patterns of biological variation and patterns of perceived difference. He argues that race and human diversity are different subjects, and do not map on to one another well. This view is now the stated consensus of the American Association of Physical Anthropologists.

As described in his book Is Science Racist?, Marks considers science to have four epistemic qualities: naturalism, experimentalism, rationalism, and a primary value on accuracy. In this book and in Why I Am Not a Scientist, he argues that anthropologists have an ambiguous relationship with science because their goal of illuminating the human condition requires both scientific and humanistic frameworks.

In reference to the titles of his books, Marks has stated that "he would like it to be known, for the record, that he is about 98% scientist, and not a chimpanzee."

Selected works
 Evolutionary Anthropology, with Edward Staski (1991). .
 Human Biodiversity (1995). .
 What It Means to be 98% Chimpanzee: Apes, People and their Genes (2002). .
 Why I Am Not a Scientist (2009). .
 The Alternative Introduction to Biological Anthropology (2010). .
 Tales of the Ex-Apes: How We Think about Human Evolution (2015). .
 Is Science Racist? (2017). .

References

External links
blog review of Why I Am Not a Scientist
Faculty page, UNCC
personal blog

1955 births
American anthropologists
Johns Hopkins University alumni
Living people
University of Arizona alumni
University of California, Berkeley faculty
University of California, Davis alumni
University of North Carolina at Charlotte faculty
Yale University faculty